Torul is a town and district of Gümüşhane Province in the Black Sea region of Turkey. According to the 2010 census, population of the district is 12,385 of which 4,421 live in the town of Torul.

See also 
 Zigana Pass

Notes

References

External links

 District governor's official website 
 District municipality's official website 
 Road map of Torul and environs
 Ardassa

Populated places in Gümüşhane Province
Districts of Gümüşhane Province